Carezzano is a comune (municipality) in the Province of Alessandria in the Italian region Piedmont, located about  southeast of Turin and about  southeast of Alessandria.
Carezzano borders the following municipalities: Cassano Spinola, Castellania Coppi, Costa Vescovato, Paderna, Sant'Agata Fossili, Tortona, and Villalvernia.

References

Cities and towns in Piedmont